Gender feminism may refer to:

 A term used by Christina Hoff Sommers in the 1994 book Who Stole Feminism?
 A form of difference feminism
 Care-focused feminism